Izabella Arazova (born 25 September 1936) is an Armenian composer.

Biography
Izabella Konstantinovna Arazova (Arazian) was born in Rostov-na-Donu, Russia SFSR, Soviet Union. She studied music at Melikyan Music College from 1955 to 1958, composition with Orest Yevlakhov at the Leningrad Conservatory from 1961 to 1963, and composition with Edvard Mirzoyan at the Yerevan Conservatory from 1964 to 1967. After completing her studies, she taught orchestration, composition and harmony at the Pedagogical Institute in Yerevan until 1990. In 1967 she became a member of the Armenian Composers' Union.

Arazova's works have been performed in Armenia, Russia, Estonia, Ukraine, the United States, Japan, France and Switzerland. She has resided in Yerevan since 1942.

Works
Selected works include:

String Quartet no.1, 1965
Polyphonic Choruses (S. Kaputikyan), 1966
Concerto for Orchestra 1967
6 Allegories (V. Grigoryan), 1v, pf, 1969
Elegy, vc, pf, 1969
Triptych, symphony (Kaputikyan), chorus, orch, 1972
3 yaponskikh stikhotvoreniy  (3 Japanese poems from the Middle Ages), 1v, pf, 1979
5 Retrospections, pf, 1983
Sonata no.1, vc, 1983
Sonata no.2, vc, pf, 1984
Perpetuum mobile, vc, pf, 1985
Sonata, pf 1985
Sonata no.3 'Sonata-Mystery', vc, pf, 1987
The World is Just a Dream (Japanese poems from the Middle Ages), 1v, pf, 1988
Sonata, vn, pf 1991
String Quartet no.2, 1991
Quattro, 4 vc, 1995
Prayer, orch, 1996

References

1936 births
Living people
Musicians from Rostov-on-Don
Soviet Armenians
20th-century classical composers
Music educators
Women classical composers
Armenian composers
Women music educators
20th-century women composers